Zain Shaito is an American Olympic Fencer who competed in the individual fencing event at the 2012 Olympic Games held in London, losing to Chinese fencer Zhu Jun.

Shaito, who was on the national Ohio State fencing team, won the individual title in men’s foil at the NCAA Fencing Championships in 2012.  He was named the 2011-12 Ohio State Male Athlete of the Year, becoming the second fencer in OSU history to earn the title.  Shaito also helped anchor the United States men's junior foil team in 2007 to the first ever World Championship victory.

References

External links
 

Living people
Fencers at the 2012 Summer Olympics
Olympic fencers of Lebanon
1990 births
American people of Lebanese descent
American people of Palestinian descent
American male foil fencers
Lebanese male foil fencers
Sportspeople of Lebanese descent